John Bullock Clark Jr. (January 14, 1831 – September 7, 1903) was a general in the Confederate States Army during the American Civil War and a postbellum five-term U.S. Congressman from Missouri.

Biography
Clark was born in Fayette, Missouri, the son of John Bullock Clark, a three-term member of the United States House of Representatives. He attended Fayette Academy and the University of Missouri before spending two years in California for travel and adventure. Clark moved to the East and graduated from the law department of Harvard University in 1854. He was admitted to the bar and practiced in his native Fayette from 1855 until the commencement of the Civil War.

He entered the Confederate army as a lieutenant and was promoted successively to the rank of captain and then major in the 6th Missouri Infantry. He saw action in several battles, including Carthage and Springfield. Promoted to the regiment's colonelcy, Clark commanded a brigade at the Battle of Pea Ridge. Primarily serving in Missouri and Arkansas under Thomas C. Hindman, he was rewarded with a commission as a brigadier general on March 6, 1864. He then fought in the Trans-Mississippi Theater under John S. Marmaduke and Jo Shelby, including Price's Raid.

After the war, he resumed his law practice in Fayette and was elected as a Democrat to the Forty-third and to the four succeeding Congresses, serving from 1873 until 1883. He was Chairman of the  Committee on the Post Office and Post Roads (Forty-fourth Congress). Clark was an unsuccessful candidate for renomination in 1882, but stayed in Washington, D.C. as the Clerk of the House of Representatives from 1883 until 1889, when he retired from politics.

He engaged in the practice of law in Washington, D.C. until his death in that city. He was buried in Rock Creek Cemetery.

Clark is the namesake of the city of Clark, Missouri.

See also

 List of American Civil War generals (Confederate)

Notes

References
 Retrieved on 2009-04-30
 Eicher, John H., and David J. Eicher, Civil War High Commands. Stanford: Stanford University Press, 2001. .
 Sifakis, Stewart. Who Was Who in the Civil War. New York: Facts On File, 1988. .
 Warner, Ezra J. Generals in Gray: Lives of the Confederate Commanders. Baton Rouge: Louisiana State University Press, 1959. .

1831 births
1903 deaths
Lawyers from Washington, D.C.
Missouri lawyers
Harvard Law School alumni
Confederate States Army generals
Clerks of the United States House of Representatives
People of Missouri in the American Civil War
University of Missouri alumni
Missouri State Guard
Democratic Party members of the United States House of Representatives from Missouri
19th-century American politicians
People from Fayette, Missouri
Burials at Rock Creek Cemetery